Bella Clara Ventura is a Colombian-Mexican novelist and poet. Born in Bogota, she studied in Paris. Director, screenwriter and film producer for 10 years, with awards to board their productions. One of the pioneers of cinema in the 70s in Colombia with Ciro Duran, Mario Ventura Mitrotti and Joyce.

For 25 years he devotes himself to literature:

14 poems published:

"Diaspora and Awe" 1995 "Far" 2000, "Spells Forest" 2001, Region I Without Borders without Borders Region II, "Guest of light" 2004, "Spells and retablos" 2004 and "Girl Inside "2004 Glimpses of Light 2006, 2008 Oasis of an awakening," trees of Milk and Honey "Eros in Canto (Editorial Black Sheep and Casa del Poeta Peruano 2010) -. Peace Sicaria tear (Editorial Ovaje Black and Alejo editions Peru 2011), FREEDOM, GUEST OF HEART, Editions du Cygne Prais bilingual version, 55 days without you, Editions du Cygne, 2015 Beings of Light in as new process about to be released in Madrid poems.

Nine novels published: "Almamocha" 1993, "What life wants" 1997, "Armando Fire" 2001 published by Editorial Oveja Negra, the same as the beginning of Gabriel García Márquez, a novel published by Centaur Thrive, "The wind shadow "2004, recognized as a best seller in the Miami Herald," Contigo learned 2007 Editores Spain Lord Byron, "The Voice of Passion 2008 Editorial Oveja Negra. Trees of Milk and Honey (2009) and HOSTAGE OF MEMORY (novel) Editorial Oveja Negra, December. 2009, Eros in singing (poems, Editorial Oveja Negra and House of the Peruvian poet 2010 Peace Sicaria Teardrop (poems, Editorial Oveja Negra and Alejo Editions Peru 2011). The Voice of Violence (editorial Black Sheep, and Alejo Editions Peru novel 2011) TO AFRICA IN MY SKIN (Lord Byron Editions 2014), with the Editorial Mundibook - Madrid;. "Canada forever" process 2015. In the poems "Beings of Light" published in Chile and soon poetry anthology Bella Clara Ventura out in Madrid published by Ediciones Editorial Lord Byron in 2016.

The story is not alien, has over 20 anthologized and translated in several parts of the world, with wide recognition and awards outlined below. Invited to literary events in USA, Sweden, France, Mexico, Argentina, Uruguay, Chile, Peru, EcuadorSpain, Puerto Rico, Mexico, India, Hungary, USA, Israel etc. ... currently writing a new novel "Flight of Love "and new poems in conjunction with Ernesto Kahan. Invited to give lectures around the world, most recently in Leon Guanajuato (Mexico) in 2015.

Bella Clara Ventura writes articles for various news media, radio program director and yoga teacher what Machado says that "only makes walking."

VicePresident of Organización Mundial de Trovadores- O.M.T.- Israel
Ambassador of the peace organization based in Geneva
Embrace group representative Uruguay Brazil
Former ambassador of Poets of the World
IFLAC former ambassador to Colombia (Agency peace in art and literature)
Delegate of the Society of French Poets
Honorary President of the Latin American Union of the letters (UHE)
Representative of the House of Peruvian Poets
Vocal Pen Colombia
Chosen as one of the top 50 women of Culture (University of St. Thomas, Bogotá) 2008.

Recent Awards
First Poem Award Guadalquivir (in Spain 2011)
First Prize El Rosal (mother poem, University of Miami, 2011)
First Contest My God (Israel 2011
Chile Concepcion 2012 - Alas Poetry Prize
Award for work in Turkey 2013
Honorary Doctorate of the World Academy of Culture and Arts (2011 USA)
And a special thanks to the work in Israel (2015).

References

External links
  Anthology of poetry

20th-century Colombian poets
Mexican novelists
Living people
Year of birth missing (living people)
21st-century Colombian poets
20th-century Mexican poets
21st-century Mexican poets
Colombian women novelists
Mexican women novelists
21st-century Mexican women writers
20th-century Mexican women writers
20th-century Colombian novelists
20th-century Colombian women writers
21st-century Colombian women writers
21st-century Colombian novelists